Edmund Barrett Johnson (9 March 1883 – 15 December 1955) was an Australian rules footballer who played with South Melbourne in the Victorian Football League (VFL).

Notes

External links 

1883 births
1955 deaths
Australian rules footballers from Melbourne
Sydney Swans players